Hibbertia surcularis is a species of flowering plant in the family Dilleniaceae and is endemic to eastern Australia. It is a low, spreading, rhizome-forming shrub with glabrous foliage, linear leaves and yellow flowers with four stamens joined at the base on one side of two carpels.

Description
The flowers are arranged on the ends of branches with three or four linear bracts at the base. Flowering occurs in October and November.

Taxonomy
Hibbertia surcularis was first formally described in 2012 by Hellmut R. Toelken in the Journal of the Adelaide Botanic Gardens from specimens collected in Boonoo Boonoo National Park in 1989. The specific epithet (surcularis) means "suckered", referring to the many "erect aerial tufts of an ever increasing area".

Distribution and habitat
This hibbertia grows in moist or swampy places in heathland in or near forest or woodland on the Northern Tablelands of New South Wales and south-eastern Queenlsland.

See also
List of Hibbertia species

References

surcularis
Flora of New South Wales
Flora of Queensland
Plants described in 2012
Taxa named by Hellmut R. Toelken